Raymond De Belser (17 June 1929 – 3 October 2014), pseudonym Ward Ruyslinck, was a Belgian writer. He is the son of Leo De Belser and Germaine Nauwelaers. His father was a librarian at an oil company, and Ward Ruyslinck grew up in a Roman Catholic family. During the Second World War, the family moved to Mortsel.

Early life

Ruyslinck was born in Berchem. At age 12, he had written a novel, Vaargeulen (in English, Channels). His father, who himself wrote the novel Gepantserde Beschaving (Armoured Civilization), sent his son's novel to Stijn Streuvels, who returned the novel unread but with an accompanying letter full of recommendations. The manuscript was lost during an air raid in 1943, which devastated their house. He wrote a number of poems and stories, some of which were published in the daily Het Vlaamsche land.

After he finished high school in 1947, he attended the University of Ghent to study Germanic philology. He dropped out after a year, which he has claimed was a consequence of the deep impact on him of the death of his older brother in 1948. He wrote five poems on the occasion of his brother's death, which were distributed among family and friends.

Career

He has worked as a translator for a traveling agency and at an oil company. He was also appointed curator of the picture collection of the Plantin-Moretus Museum in Antwerp.

He married Alice Burm, and together they have one son, Chris.

His collection of poems, Fanaal in de mist (1956), was awarded the Poëzieprijs der Algemene Kunstkamer in België. In 1957, he published the short story De ontaarde slapers, about one of his main themes — the unequal battle between individuals and their communities.

His most widely read book  ("Incense and Tears") was published in 1958. In 1961, with the novel Het dal van Hinnom, he broke with church and society. In 1964, he moved to Pulle and wrote the novel Het reservaat about the illusion of individual freedom. He won the Prijs voor Letterkunde van de Vlaamse provincies for this work. In 1966, he wrote the bittersweet fairy tale Golden Ophelia.

During the sixties and seventies he traveled a great deal to research magazine articles and visited Poland, the Soviet Union, Canada, and Argentina. In 1975, he became a member of The Royal Academies for Science and the Arts of Belgium, and he became its president in 1985. In 1980, he was awarded the first Europalia prize for his entire oeuvre.

Ward Ruyslinck retired in 1984. After the suicide of his wife in 1990, he moved to Meise to live with his mistress Monika Lo Cascio. Ward Ruyslinck and Monika Lo Cascio jointly wrote the autobiographical novel De speeltuin ("The Playground") in 1992.

Ruyslinck's work combines social commitment with a pessimistic view of life, humor, and satire. Several of his works were adapted for theatre. De slakken, Golden Ophelia, and Wierook en tranen were made into movies.

Ruyslinck, who suffered from Alzheimer's disease, died on 3 October 2014 in a retirement home in Meise.

Bibliography
English
 The depraved sleepers, and Golden Ophelia. Boston, Twayne Publishers, 1978. (Transl. of De ontaarde slapers and Golden Ophelia, by Ralph Baden Powell & David Smith).  
 The reservation. London, Owen, 1978. (Transl. of Het reservaat by David Smith.) 
 Golden Ophelia. London, Owen, 1975. (Transl. of Golden Ophelia by David Smith.) 
 The deadbeats. London, Owen, 1968 (Transl. of De ontaarde slapers by Ralph Baden Powell)

Dutch

 1951 - De citer van Tijl
 1952 - Het huis onder de beuken
 1953 - De essentie van het zwijgen
 1956 - Fanaal in de mist
 1957 - De ontaarde slapers
 1958 - Wierook en tranen
 1959 - De madonna met de buil
 1961 - Het dal van Hinnom
 1962 - De stille zomer
 1964 - Het reservaat
 1965 - De paardevleeseters
 1965 - Drek- en driftliteratuur
 1966 - Golden Ophelia
 1968 - Het ledikant van Lady Cant
 1969 - De Karakoliërs
 1970 - De apokatastasis of het apocriefe boek van Galax Niksen
 1971 - De krekelput
 1971 - Neozoïsch. Parapoëtische montages
 1972 - De heksenkring
 1973 - De verliefde akela
 1974 - Het ganzenbord
 1976 - In naam van de beesten
 1977 - De sloper in het slakkehuis
 1977 - Valentijn van Uytvanck
 1978 - Op toernee met Leopold Sondag
 1979 - Alle verhalen
 1980 - Wurgtechnieken
 1981 - Open brief aan de gevoelsafschaffers
 1982 - De boze droom het medeleven
 1983 - Leegstaande huizen
 1983 - Open beeldboek
 1985 - De uilen van Minerva
 1987 - Stille waters
 1988 - Hunkerend gevangen
 1989 - IJlings naar nergens
 1992 - De speeltuin
 1993 - De claim van de duivel
 1995 - Het geboortehuis
 1997 - De bovenste trede
 1999 - Traumachia

Awards
 1958 - Romanprijs van de provincie Antwerpen
 1958 - Romanprijs van de Kempische Cultuurdagen (Hilvarenbeek)
 1959 - Referendum van de Vlaamse letterkundigen
 1960 - Arkprijs van het Vrije Woord
 1960 - Referendum van de Vlaamse letterkundigen
 1962 - Referendum van de Vlaamse letterkundigen
 1962 - De prijs van de Vlaamse lezer
 1964 - August Beernaertprijs van de Koninklijke Academie voor Nederlandse Taal- en Letterkunde
 1967 - Prijs voor Letterkunde van de Vlaamse Provinciën
 1975 - Het Gulden Boek van de Lezende Jeugd (V.B.V.B.)
 1976 - Romanprijs van de provincie Antwerpen
 1980 - Europaliaprijs voor Literatuur
 2005 - Prijs voor Letterkunde van de provincie Antwerpen voor het gezamenlijke oeuvre

See also
 Flemish literature

References

Sources
 
 Website of Frits de Vries, biographer of Ward Ruyslinck
 Ward Ruyslinck

External links
 

1929 births
2014 deaths
Flemish writers
Ark Prize of the Free Word winners
People from Berchem